Participatory art is an approach to making art which engages public participation in the creative process, letting them become co-authors, editors, and observers of the work. This type of art is incomplete without viewers' physical interaction. It intends to challenge the dominant form of making art in the West, in which a small class of professional artists make the art while the public takes on the role of passive observer or consumer, i.e., buying the work of the professionals in the marketplace. Commended works by advocates who popularized participatory art include Augusto Boal in his Theater of the Oppressed, as well as Allan Kaprow in happenings.

One of the earliest usages of the term appears in photographer Richard Ross's review for the Los Angeles Institute of Contemporary Art journal of the exhibition "Downtown Los Angeles Artists," organized by the Santa Barbara Contemporary Arts Forum in 1980. Describing in situ works by Jon Peterson, Maura Sheehan and Judith Simonian anonymously placed around Santa Barbara, Ross wrote, "These artists bear the responsibility to the community. Their art is participatory."

Definition 
Participatory art requires of the artist that they either not be present, or that they somehow are able to recede far enough to become equal with the participants. This is the only way that participants might be offered the agency of creation; without this detail, participants will always respond within the domain of authority of the artist; they will be subjugated in this way, and the work will fail to be participatory. This detail is centrally important in asserting participation as a form in itself, and effectively differentiates participation from interactive, community based art and socially engaged art. Any of these techniques can include the presence of the artist, as it will not impinge upon the outcome of the work in the same way.

There are various degrees of participation from nominal manipulation of an object like the wearable sculptures of Lygia Clark to the relinquishing of the artist's body to the whims of the audience in the 1974 performance Rhythm 0 by Marina Abramović. New media theorist Beryl Graham has compared the varying degrees of participation in the arts to the eight rungs of power described in Sherry Arnstein's "Ladder of Citizen Participation"—ranging from manipulation to token consulting, to complete citizen control.

In the Fall/Winter issue of Oregon Humanities magazine, writer Eric Gold describes "an artistic tradition called 'social practice,' which refers to works of art in which the artist, audience, and their interactions with one another are the medium. While a painter uses pigment and canvas, and a sculptor wood or metal, the social practice artist often creates a scenario in which the audience is invited to participate. Although the results may be documented with photography, video, or otherwise, the artwork is really the interactions that emerge from the audience's engagement with the artist and the situation."

Participatory or interactive art creates a dynamic collaboration between the artist, the audience and their environment. Participatory art is not just something that you stand still and quietly look at–it is something you participate in. You touch it, smell it, write on it, talk to it, dance with it, play with it, learn from it. You co-create it.

The problem of naming in participatory art 
There are many examples of artists making interactive, socially-engaged, or community-based projects. The problem these pose arises when they are each used interchangeably with the term "participatory art". It is tempting but wrong to use the term in this way because participatory art is a form unto itself, while other types of art that interface with the public (social practice, socially-engaged art, community-based art, etc.) are its sub-types. While it may seem paradoxical, it is essential to understand that just because an artwork engages with the public, that does not make it participatory. It is important to point out that there has been some nominal obfuscation of participatory art, causing its appreciation as a distinct form to be stymied. It is most likely that this occurred simultaneously with the development of the term Relational Aesthetics by Bourriaud in the late 1990s. Some other art-making techniques, such as 'community-based art', 'interactive art', or 'socially-engaged art' have been (mis) labeled as participatory art, simply because the subtleties of distinction are not always clearly understood or cared about. Many forms of popular culture and media beyond visual art have grown increasingly participatory with the rise of the Internet and social media, which allow users to "participate" at a distance. We are led to believe this is 'participatory' but as we know, engaging with social media platforms (participating) is actually contributing free labor. This type of 'participation' has nothing to do with art, but it does reflect the core problem with naming in this area of art-making. Participation can be used as an umbrella term for the various types of interfacing that artworks have created with the public. For example, 100 people working directly with an artist to make art in a museum is entirely different from an artist project sited in a local community center in an impoverished area of a city. We can say that both necessarily include engaging the public, but it is important that they not be conflated with participatory art simply because on the one hand, the outcomes of each are so entirely different, and intended to be so (where the former is enmeshed in and remains in the rarefied art world, while the latter is only of true public value in its original setting) while on the other, engagement is not participation. As we see in this example, the sub-tyes of participatory art are recognizable by their names, but they are not all the same. Further complexity can be seen in the fact that participatory art can itself be a form. It is distinguished from its sub-types by the absence of the author. this is the primary important factor in defining what is truly participatory art because when the author is not present or known, the participant gains true agency, and is fully participating. In any of the sub-forms (socially-engaged art, community-based art, etc.) participants are at best collaborators and at worst, human media. In either case, all 'participants' become subjugated by the physical presence of the artist, denying them autonomy.

Examples 
Janet Cardiff has created various audio tours that users experience by walking site-specific routes and listening to soundscapes composed by the artist.

Figment is an annual showcase of participatory art in New York City.

Antony Gormley has involved the public in the creation of several works, most notably One & Other which invited hundreds of participants to occupy the vacant plinth in Trafalgar Square and perform or otherwise contribute to the work.

Carsten Höller has created interactive installations like Test Site (2006), which invites participants to play on giant slides installed in the Tate Modern.

Allan Kaprow pioneered the field of participatory art with his Happening events staged in 1960's New York City, which used physical installations and prompts to facilitate aesthetic experiences for participants.

Learning to Love you More (2002–2009) was a work of Internet art by Miranda July and Harrell Fletcher that invited participants to submit responses to written prompts, and displayed an archive of the resulting works of conceptual art.

Adrian Piper led a series of events titled Funk Lessons (1982–1984) that combined participatory dance-parties with conversations and lectures about African-American culture.

Influences 
Folk and tribal art can be considered to be a predecessor or model for contemporary "participatory art" in that many or all of the members of the society participate in the making of "art". However, the ideological issue of use arises at this point because art made in the institutions of art is by default, already part of the art world, and therefore its perceived use is entirely different from any ritualistic or traditional practices expressed by folk or tribal groups. As the ethnomusicologist Bruno Nettl wrote, the tribal group "has no specialization or professionalization; its division of labor depends almost exclusively on sex and occasionally on age, and only rarely are certain individuals proficient in any technique to a distinctive degree ... the same songs are known by all the members of the group, and there is little specialization in composition, performance or instrument making.”

See also
 Community art
 Public participation
 Relational art
 Social practice art
 Systems art
 Specialization

Subtypes of participatory art
 Photovoice
 Comic Book Project
 Create a Comic Project

References

Bibliography 
 Claire Bishop (ed.), Participation: Documents of Contemporary Art, Whitechapel Gallery/The MIT Press, 2006.
 Robert Atkins, Rudolf Frieling, Boris Groys, Lev Manovich, The Art of Participation: 1950 to Now, Thames & Hudson, 2008.
 Anna Dezeuze (ed.), The 'Do-it-yourself' Artwork: Participation from Fluxus to New Media, Manchester University Press, 2010.
 Claire Bishop, Artificial Hells: Participatory Art and the Politics of Spectatorship, Verso Books, 2012.
 Kathryn Brown (ed.), Interactive Contemporary Art: Participation in Practice, I.B. Tauris, 2014.

External links
 "What Is a Participatory Practice?" by David Goldenberg and Patricia Reed (interview)
 "Participatory Arts: The Stranger Brings a Gift" by Pia Moriarty (essay)
 "Participatory Art: A Paradigm Shift from Objects to Subjects" by Suzana Milevska (essay) 2006
 "Infelicitous Participatory Acts on the Neoliberal Stage" by Suzana Milevska (essay) 2016
 Bryant College Community/Performance Conference (2004)
 Oregon Humanities magazine, Fall/Winter 2008. (Discusses participatory art by Portland, Oregon artists including Harrell Fletcher, Julie Keefe, Sam Gould, Tiffany Lee Brown, M. K. Guth, Gary Wiseman, and M.O.S.T.)
 "Art Alienated: An Essay on the Decline of Participatory Art"
 The Art of Taking Part: Participation at the Museum,  ARKEN Bulletin, vol. 7, ed. Christian Gether, Ishøj : ARKEN Museum of Modern  Art, 2017

Visual arts genres